Port L'Hebert is a community of the Municipality of the District of Shelburne in the Canadian province of Nova Scotia. The name is pronounced in three different fashions by locals and other Nova Scotians. Some pronounce it "Port Le HERbert", while others pronounce it "Port Le HEbert" or "Port Le BEAR". All can be considered correct.

References
Port L'Hebert on Destination Nova Scotia

Communities in Shelburne County, Nova Scotia
General Service Areas in Nova Scotia